Move Your Body may refer to:

 "Move Your Body" (Marshall Jefferson song), 1986
 "Move Your Body", by Phil Drummond, 1991
 "Move Your Body", by Ruffneck (band), 1996
 "Move Your Body" (Eiffel 65 song), 1999
 "Move Your Body", a video by Hi-5, 1999
 "Move Your Body" (Beyoncé song), 2011
 "Move Your Body" (Sia song), 2016
 "Move Your Body", by Sean Paul, 2017